Silveira v. Lockyer, 312 F.3d 1052 (9th Cir. 2002), is a decision by the United States Court of Appeals for the Ninth Circuit ruling that the Second Amendment to the United States Constitution did not guarantee individuals the right to bear arms. The case involved a challenge to the constitutionality of the Roberti-Roos Assault Weapons Control Act of 1989 (AWCA), California legislation that banned the manufacture, sale, transportation, or importation of specified semi-automatic firearms. The plaintiffs alleged that various provisions of the AWCA infringed upon their individual constitutionally-guaranteed right to keep and bear arms.

Judge Stephen R. Reinhardt wrote the opinion of the three-member panel. The court engaged in an extensive analysis of the history of the Second Amendment and its attendant case law. The court concluded that the Second Amendment did not guarantee individuals the right to keep and bear arms. Instead, the court concluded that the Second Amendment provides "collective" rights, which is limited to the arming of state militia. The Ninth Circuit refused to hear the case en banc but issued a set of dissenting opinions to the denial to take the case en banc, which included a notable opinion by Judge Alex Kozinski. The U.S. Supreme Court denied review.

The decision conflicted with the holding of the Fifth Circuit in United States v. Emerson.

In the U.S. Supreme Court case of District of Columbia v. Heller, the opinion in Silveira v. Lockyer was overruled. The Supreme Court held in Heller that the right to keep and bear arms is a right of individuals. The Supreme Court also later held in McDonald v. Chicago, in 2010, that the Second Amendment is an incorporated right, meaning that it is applicable to state governments and to the federal government.

See also
Firearm case law in the United States

References

United States Court of Appeals for the Ninth Circuit cases
United States Second Amendment case law
2002 in United States case law